WOBB (100.3 FM) is a radio station broadcasting a country music format. Licensed to Tifton, Georgia, United States, the station serves the Albany, Georgia area.  The station is owned by iHeartMedia, Inc. and features programming from Premiere Radio Networks.  Its studios are on Westover Boulevard in Albany, and the transmitter is located southeast of Sylvester, Georgia.

History
The station was assigned call sign WCUP on April 16, 1985.  On August 1, 1985, the station changed its call sign to WSGY, and on March 18, 1994, to the current WOBB.

References

External links

OBB
Country radio stations in the United States
Radio stations established in 1985
1985 establishments in Georgia (U.S. state)
IHeartMedia radio stations